There were several  gentry families named Lvov in the Russian Empire.

One of them is traced from a Mark Demidovich of Lithuanian descent (14th century) and is enlisted into the pedigree book of Tver Guberniya.

Another one traces from the 16th century and enlisted into the pedigree books of Moscow and Oryol guberniyas.

Still another one descends from a Kondratiy Afanasiyevich Lvov granted an estate in Galich uyezd, Kostroma Guberniya in 1671. The family is enlisted into the pedigree book of Kostroma Guberniya.

See also
Lvov princely family

External links
Lvov dvoryan family

Russian noble families